"Wish" is the fifteenth single of the Japanese boy band Arashi. The single was released in two editions: a regular edition containing karaoke versions of the songs released in the single, and a limited edition containing a bonus track. The regular edition also contains a hidden track of the group's Secret Talk, in which the members' conversation lasted about forty-two minutes in total before the track was edited down to about thirty-eight minutes.

Single Information
"Wish" was used as the theme song and at the same time opening song for the drama Hana Yori Dango starring Mao Inoue, Arashi member Jun Matsumoto, Shun Oguri, Shota Matsuda and Tsuyoshi Abe. Matsumoto accepted his role of Tsukasa Dōmyōji in Hana Yori Dango so that the group would be able release "Wish" as their next single.

Track listing

Charts and certifications

Charts

Sales and certifications

References

External links
 Product information 

Arashi songs
2005 singles
Oricon Weekly number-one singles
Japanese television drama theme songs
J Storm singles
2005 songs